Idiot: O Chanti Gaadi Prema Katha is a 2002 Indian Telugu-language action romantic comedy film which released on 22 August 2002 and was directed by Puri Jagannadh. It was the second collaboration between Ravi Teja and Puri Jagannadh after the successful film Itlu Sravani Subramanyam. The dialogue was written by Puri Jagannadh with soundtrack by Chakri. This film stars Ravi Teja and Rakshita. It turned out to be a Blockbuster. The film ran for 100 days in 36 centres. The film was a remake of director's own 2002 Kannada movie Appu.

Plot
Chantigadu is the son of a head constable Venkata Swamy. Chanti is a guy with a carefree attitude. He is beaten by a rival gang at night and was rescued by a beautiful girl Suchitra. She pays his hospital bills and donates her blood. She is gone from the hospital by the time Chanti became conscious. When Chanti's friends inform him about the girl who rescued him, he starts loving her immediately for her goodheartedness, though he did not see her. Suchi later turns out to be the daughter of the city police commissioner Vipra Narayana.

Chanti meets Suchi in the college for the first time and expresses his love. When she does not agree, he tries to tease her. She complains to her father, and he takes Chanti to the police station and severely beats him before being rescued by his father and his fellow constables. Even though Chanti is beaten by Narayana, he becomes more adamant to win his ladylove. He proposes to Suchi again in the college. She asks him to jump from the building. When he is ready to do so, she agrees to his love.

However, Narayana is not happy about their relationship and ropes in some rowdies to amputate his leg. Suchi discovers this and runs to help him, but is met with an accident. Both of them get admitted to the same hospital, and they unite there also. Narayana finally arranges her marriage with another person, to which she openly opposes and tries to commit suicide. Chanti comes and rescues her, but Narayana still wants to get her married to a man of his own choice. He also engages goons to kill Chanti. Chanti finally escapes all the troubles and meets the DGP to help him to marry his love. The DGP finally suspends Narayana and arranges Chanti's marriage in the police station. Finally, Chanti appears for civil services and is selected for IPS.

Cast

Production 
This is a remake of the Kannada film Appu directed by Puri Jagannath which was the debut movie of Puneeth Rajkumar.

Soundtrack
The music was composed by Chakri and released by Aditya Music.

References

External links
 

2002 films
Telugu remakes of Kannada films
Films directed by Puri Jagannadh
Films scored by Chakri
2000s Telugu-language films
Indian action comedy films
2000s masala films
2002 action comedy films